God's Crooked Lines is a 2022 Spanish psychological thriller film directed by Oriol Paulo and starring Bárbara Lennie. Written by Oriol Paulo and Guillem Clua with the collaboration of Lara Sendim, the screenplay is an adaptation of the 1979 novel of the same name by Torcuato Luca de Tena. The plot follows Alice Gould (Lennie), a woman entering a psychiatric ward in order to investigate the mysterious circumstances pertaining a death in the facility.

The film had its world premiere at the 70th San Sebastián International Film Festival. It earned six nominations at the 37th Goya Awards, including Best Leading Actress (Lennie) and Adapted Screenplay.

Plot 
In 1979,  Alice Gould de Almenara enters a psychiatric ward. Left at the gates by a man, she is interrogated by Dr. Ruipérez, who reads a letter by Dr. Donadío. Alice insists that she has been "legally abducted" by her husband Heliodoro so he could seize her riches. Dr. Castell introduces the facility to Alice, who begins to do investigative fieldwork on the death of Dr. Raimundo García del Olmo's son Damián. Alice (or Alicia) gets acquainted with Ignacio Urquieta and the twins (Rómulo and Remo) as well as the Gnome, a sexual molester protected by the Elephant Man, who shows animosity towards Rómulo. Alice attends sessions by Dr. Arellano.

Running along the primary timeline, a secondary timeline starts in a rainy night, in which a fire and riot take place and a corpse is found in one of the cells. In this timeline Urquieta is incriminated by the cops (after which a forensic doctor also comes into action) and later cleared from suspicions.

In the main timeline, Urquieta is interrogated by Alicia whether if he suffers from schizophrenia, the condition Alice believes Damián's killer suffers from. It starts raining and it becomes evident that Urquieta suffers from an irrational fear of water. Urquieta later reveals that Damián was at odds with the Gnome.

Alicia is hit in the forest by the Gnome, waking up tied to a bed with Arellano telling her she is the presumed killer of the Gnome although she has trouble remembering what happened after the hit. Alice personally meets Director Samuel Alvar, claiming that she has already exchanged letters with him upon guidance from García del Olmo so she could know how to enter the institution. Alvar denies this. Alicia attacks Alvar and tries to escape, only to be sedated.

Alicia tells Castell her suspicions about Damián's murder and asks for a meeting of the medical council. Alvar claims that Alice has been interned upon recommendation by Donadío on behalf of Heliodoro. She claims that she tricked Ruipérez and feigned a mental illness to enter the facility, telling how she met García del Olmo and set out an investigation to determine what happened to Damián. How García del Olmo gave her instructions that she should feign a condition of paranoia to be able to enter the facility and how they managed to get Donadío to attest her condition and Heliodoro to sign the permission to withhold her. Alvar tells that Alice, offended because the man she chose to marry only wanted her money, tried to kill him by poisoning; Heliodoro, after recovering from a seizure, found Alice hiding poison; and knowing herself caught, she decided to fabricate a private investigator persona.

After failing to identify a man whom Alvar identifies as García del Olmo, Alice is electro-shocked, and taken to the Cage, where she becomes convinced that she has been framed by Heliodoro, who hired someone to impersonate García del Olmo. She tells Arellano and Castell that in case her bank accounts are emptied there can be a plausible explanation for the behaviour of Heliodoro, Donadío and Alvar. Castell confirms that Alvar has been overpaid by Heliodoro for Alice's internment. Alicia escapes from her cell and develops a plan to light a fire while Urquieta frees the rest of patients. Urquieta finds one of the twins dead in a cell, it becoming evident that the events of the secondary timeline pertain to the aftermath of Alice's plan. Alicia crosses paths with the forensic doctor, who tells her about Rómulo's death. Alicia knocks her down and impersonates her. She cracks the identity of the twin's killer (the Elephant Man). Cops confirm that Alice's account was emptied.

Castell convenes a meeting of the council to discharge Alice. Alice meets with the living twin and reveals that the dead one is actually Remo. Alvar renounces his vote, while the other four doctors clear Alice. Alvar lets Donadío into the room. To Alice's dismay, Donadío turns out to be the man she identified as García del Olmo.

Cast

Production 

Bernat Bosch took over cinematography duties whereas Fernando Velázquez worked as composer. Jaume Martí was responsible for film editing. The film was produced by Nostromo Pictures, Atresmedia Cine and Filmayer.

Filming started in May 2021, and wrapped 9 weeks later.

Shooting took place in several locations of the provinces of Tarragona and Barcelona, including Terrassa, Barcelona, and Tarragona. The old  in Tarragona and a former Mercedes car plant in Barcelona were used to portray the psychiatric hospital.

Release 
The film was presented in the  section of the 70th San Sebastián International Film Festival in September 2022. It was originally scheduled to be released theatrically in Spain on 7 October 2022 by Warner Bros. Pictures España. The theatrical release date was later moved forward one day to 6 October 2022. After a two-month theatrical window, it was released on Netflix on 9 December 2022. By the time of its streaming debut, it was the third highest-grossing Spanish film of 2022 at the domestic box office, with an in-year gross around €5.5 million.

Reception 
Rubén Romero Santos of Cinemanía rated the film 3½ out of 5 stars, deeming it to be "a thrilling and elegant" exercise of narrative shell gaming. Beatriz Martínez of El Periódico de Catalunya rated the film 4 out of 5 stars, considering that "the intrigue finds a perfect balance between stylization and magnetism", also praising the "titanic" adaptation work, "in which not only the language is cleaned and distilled", "but also the stale substratum from the novel". Raquel Hernández Luján of HobbyConsolas rated the film with 50 out of 100 points ("so-so"), considering that it fails at respecting the heart of the novel (the dignification of the mentally ill and the value put on the work of the staff), praising the art direction and costume design while negatively assessing the direction of actors and the overextended footage achieved by a number of consecutive closures. Juan Pando of Fotogramas rated the film 3 out of 5 stars, considering that it is "the kind of film that attracts viewers to the theaters and does not disappoint them", while noting that its footage could have been trimmed and its outcome simplified.

Top ten lists 
The film appeared on a number of critics' top ten lists of the best Spanish films of 2022:

Accolades 

|-
| rowspan = "20" align = "center" | 2023
| rowspan = "8" | 15th Gaudí Awards || Best Actress || Bárbara Lennie ||  || rowspan = "8" | 
|-
| Best Supporting Actor || Eduard Fernández || 
|-
| Best Adapted Screenplay || Oriol Paulo, Guillem Clua || 
|-
| Best Art Direction || Sylvia Steinbrech || 
|-
| Best Costume Design || Alberto Valcárcel || 
|-
| Best Makeup and Hairstyles || Montse Sanfeliu, Carolina Atxukarro || 
|-
| Best Visual Effects || Lluís Rivera, Alex Villagrasa || 
|-
| Best Sound || Aitor Berenguer, Laura Díaz, Marc Orts || 
|-
| rowspan = "2" | 10th Feroz Awards || Best Soundtrack || Fernando Velázquez ||  || rowspan = "2" | 
|-
| Best Trailer || Pedro J. Bernardo || 
|-
|-
| rowspan = "3" | 78th CEC Medals || Best Actress || Bárbara Lennie ||  || rowspan = "3" | 
|-
| Best Adapted Screenplay || Oriol Paulo, Guillem Clua, Lara Sendim || 
|-
| Best Music || Fernando Velázquez || 
|-
| rowspan = "6" | 37th Goya Awards || Best Actress || Bárbara Lennie ||  || rowspan = "6" | 
|-
| Best Adapted Screenplay || Guillem Clua, Oriol Paulo ||  
|-
| Best Original Score || Fernando Velázquez ||  
|-
| Best Art Direction || Sylvia Steinbrecht || 
|-
| Best Costume Design || Alberto Valcárcel || 
|-
| Best Makeup and Hairstyles || Montse Sanfeliu, Carolina Atxukarro, Pablo Perona || 
|-
| 31st Actors and Actresses Union Awards || Best Film Actress in a Leading Role || Bárbara Lennie ||  || 
|}

See also 
 List of Spanish films of 2022

Notes

References

External links
 

2022 psychological thriller films
2020s Spanish films
2020s Spanish-language films
Atresmedia Cine films
Films based on Spanish novels
Films directed by Oriol Paulo
Films scored by Fernando Velázquez
Films set in 1979
Films set in psychiatric hospitals
Films shot in Barcelona
Films shot in the province of Tarragona
Nostromo Pictures films
Spanish nonlinear narrative films
Spanish psychological thriller films